Iriartella setigera (common name: paxiubinha) is a species of palm found in northern South America.  The Nukak people of Colombia use Iriartella setigera to fashion blowguns.

References

External links
Palmpedia

Iriarteeae
Flora of South America